The 3rd Grey Cup (the championship of the Canadian Football League) was played on November 25, 1911, before 13,687 fans at Varsity Stadium at Toronto.

The University of Toronto Varsity Blues defeated the Toronto Argonauts 14–7.

Game summary
U. of Toronto Varsity Blues (14) – TDs, Allan Ramsey, Frank Knight; cons., Jack Maynard (2); singles, Maynard (2).

Toronto Argonauts (7) – FG, Ross Binkley; singles, Binkley (3), Bill Mallet.

Toronto Varsity Blues roster
 Manager F.J. Mulqueen * Head Coach Dr. A.B. Wright 
Players * T. Dales * H. Taylor * G. Peter Campbell * Elliot Green * Al Ramsey * Geoffery Taylor * Lloyd Sifton * Frank Hassard * N. Lorimer * B. Frith * Bobby Singclair * Stan Clark * Pete German * J.M. "Duff" Wood * Edward "Ted" Knox * C.E. MacDonald * Frank Knight * Bill Curtis * Bob Thompson * Ralph Bell * Rod Grass * Lew Cory * Bill Cruickshank

External links
 
 

03
Grey Cup
Grey Cup, 3rd
1911 in Ontario
November 1911 sports events
1910s in Toronto
Toronto Varsity Blues football
Toronto Argonauts